Muromegalovirus is a genus of viruses in the order Herpesvirales, in the family Herpesviridae, in the subfamily Betaherpesvirinae. Rodents serve as natural hosts. There are three species in this genus. Diseases associated with this genus include: infected peritoneal macrophages, dendritic cells (DC) and hepatocytes, inducing significant pathology in both the spleen and the liver. Murid viruses Murid betaherpesvirus 1 (MuHV-1) and Murid betaherpesvirus 2 (MuHV-2), previously defined as mouse cytomegalovirus (MCMV) and rat cytomegalovirus (RCMV), belong to this genus.

Species 
The genus consists of the following three species:

 Murid betaherpesvirus 1
 Murid betaherpesvirus 2
 Murid betaherpesvirus 8

Structure 
Viruses in Muromegalovirus are enveloped, with icosahedral, spherical to pleomorphic, and round geometries, and T=16 symmetry. The diameter is around 150-200 nm. Genomes are linear and non-segmented, around 230kb in length.

Life cycle 
Viral replication is nuclear, and is lysogenic. Entry into the host cell is achieved by attachment of the viral glycoproteins to host receptors, which mediates endocytosis. Replication follows the dsDNA bidirectional replication model. DNA-templated transcription, with some alternative splicing mechanism is the method of transcription. The virus exits the host cell by nuclear egress, and  budding.
Rodents serve as the natural host.

References

External links 

 Viralzone: Muromegalovirus
 ICTV

Betaherpesvirinae
Animal viral diseases
Virus genera
Rodent diseases